The Leadmill is a nightclub and music venue in Sheffield, England.

Leadmill may also refer to:

Leadmill, Derbyshire, England
Leadmill, Flintshire, Wales; a UK location
a settlement in Highlow, Derbyshire, England

See also
 Leadville